The members of the 32nd Manitoba Legislature were elected in the Manitoba general election held in November 1981. The legislature sat from February 25, 1982, to February 11, 1986.

The New Democratic Party led by Howard Pawley formed the government.

Sterling Lyon of the Progressive Conservative Party was Leader of the Opposition. Gary Filmon became opposition leader in 1983 after Lyon resigned as party leader.

Jim Walding served as speaker for the assembly.

There were four sessions of the 32nd Legislature:

Pearl McGonigal was Lieutenant Governor of Manitoba.

Members of the Assembly 
The following members were elected to the assembly in 1981:

Notes:

By-elections 
By-elections were held to replace members for various reasons:

Notes:

References 

Terms of the Manitoba Legislature
1982 establishments in Manitoba
1986 disestablishments in Manitoba